Wael Sharaf (born 15 July 1977) is a Syrian actor and film director. He is known for playing in the historical drama Bab al-Hara seasons 1-7, which is shown during Ramadan, in which he plays Moataz.

Early life 
Wael Sharaf's real name is Wael Subhi Al-Rifai. He is the son of Syrian actor Subhi Al-Rifai. Wael is popular among a large segment of the Syrian population. Wael graduated from the Higher Institute of Dramatic Arts in Damascus in 2001. He participated in TV shows on Arab Syrian TV. He debuted in Al-Mutanabbi in 2001. He studied medicine in Ukraine, but it did not suit him. He then switched to acting. Sharaf, also called "the Arabic Johnny Depp", has got a large audience after the performance of Moataz in Bab al-Hara, which appeared across the Arab world.

Bab Al-Hara 
Bab Al-Hara started in 2006 and is one of the most popular television series in the Arab world. Sharaf appeared throughout the series, but in season 4 his role expanded. Wael Sharaf played Moataz, the son of pharmacist Abu Issam. He left the series after season 7. 

In an interview with CNN Arabic, director Bassam Al-Mulla stated that Sharaf was studying in London and that he demanded a higher wage. Bassem also stated that Wael ignored the favors the series bestowed on him. The next week Wael responded, stressing that without him the character would not have achieved the success it experienced.

Death rumor 
in 2012 rumors that Wael Sharaf had fled towards Turkey and was killed in an air raid. Sharaf laid the rumors to rest by making a public statement that he was alive and still in Syria.

Television

Dubbing roles  
Monster Rancher (TV series) as Datonares *In the name of Wael Al-Rifai
Hunter × Hunter (1999) as Phinks Magcub (episodes 58–61), Geretta , Agon , Gotoh , Riehlvelt , Melody , Owl , Assassin E , Leorio (episodes 63–70) *In the name of Wael Al-RifaiWish Kid *In the name of Wael Al-RifaiVS Knight Ramune & 40 Fire as Mito Natto *In the name of Wael Al-RifaiGeGeGe no Kitarō (2007 film)'' as Kitarō

References

External links 

 

1977 births
Living people
Syrian male television actors
Syrian directors
21st-century Syrian male actors
People from Damascus